Corbusier may refer to:

 Le Corbusier (1887–1965; as Charles-Édouard Jeanneret-Gris), Swiss architect, designer, planner, and artist
 Le Corbusier's Five Points of Architecture, the architecture manifesto of Le Corbusier
 The Architectural Work of Le Corbusier, a world heritage site
 Le Corbusier's Furniture, a furniture line
 Pavillon Le Corbusier, Seefeld, Zürich, Switzerland; an art museum for the works of Le Corbusier
 Fondation Le Corbusier, a foundation conserving the works of Le Corbusier
 Lycée Le Corbusier (disambiguation), several schools named 'Corbusier'

See also

 Les Freres Corbusier, a New York theatre company
 List of Le Corbusier buildings